The Patagonian chinchilla mouse (Euneomys chinchilloides) is a species of rodent in the family Cricetidae. It was first described by George Robert Waterhouse in 1839. It is found in Tierra del Fuego and neighboring areas of southernmost Argentina and Chile.

Taxonomy 
Euneomys chinchilloides is the current name for the Patagonian chinchilla mouse.

Distribution and habitat 
Euneomys chinchilloides can be found in the Tierra del Fuego, and are generally widespread in mainland Patagonia. They are also fairly abundant in the Sierras de Tecka, a region situated in the Andes mountains. Their habitat consists of scree that is windswept and bare.

Life history

Morphology 
The genus Euneomys are described as having medium to large body size. They have short tails and dense fur. Their molars are hypsodont.

Measurements of the body length, including the head, of Euneomys chinchilloides ranges from 103–143 mm. Tail length ranges from 62–90 mm. Hindfoot length ranges from 25–30 mm. The length of the ear ranges from 18.5-22.2 mm.

Ecology 
The genus Euneomys are herbivorous and nocturnal.

Genetics 
Euneomys chinchilloides have 34 chromosomes, although some specimens exhibited an extra pair of chromosomes.

References 

Euneomys
Mammals of Patagonia
Mammals of Argentina
Mammals of Chile
Mammals described in 1839
Taxonomy articles created by Polbot
Taxa named by George Robert Waterhouse